This is a List of World Championships medalists in men's freestyle wrestling.

Light flyweight
 48 kg: 1969–1995

Flyweight
 52 kg: 1951–1995
 54 kg: 1997–2001

Bantamweight
 57 kg: 1951–1995
 58 kg: 1997–2001
 55 kg: 2002–2013
 57 kg: 2014–

Featherweight
 62 kg: 1951–1961
 63 kg: 1962–1967
 62 kg: 1969–1995
 63 kg: 1997–2001
 60 kg: 2002–2013
 61 kg: 2014–

Lightweight
 67 kg: 1951–1961
 70 kg: 1962–1967
 68 kg: 1969–1995
 69 kg: 1997–2001
 66 kg: 2002–2013
 65 kg: 2014–

Light welterweight
 70 kg: 2014–

Welterweight
 73 kg: 1951–1961
 78 kg: 1962–1967
 74 kg: 1969–1995
 76 kg: 1997–2001
 74 kg: 2002–

Light middleweight
 79 kg: 2018–

Middleweight
 79 kg: 1951–1961
 87 kg: 1962–1967
 82 kg: 1969–1995
 85 kg: 1997–2001
 84 kg: 2002–2013
 86 kg: 2014–

Light heavyweight
 87 kg: 1951–1961
 97 kg: 1962–1967
 90 kg: 1969–1995
 92 kg: 2018–

Heavyweight
 +87 kg: 1951–1961
 +97 kg: 1962–1967
 100 kg: 1969–1995
 97 kg: 1997–2001
 96 kg: 2002–2013
 97 kg: 2014–

Super heavyweight
 +100 kg: 1969–1983
 130 kg: 1985–2001
 120 kg: 2002–2013
 125 kg: 2014–

Medal table

 Names in italic are national entities that no longer exist.

References
UWW Database
info.2008.sohu.com

Medalists
Wrestling World Championships